Haunted Mansion may also refer to:
Haunted house, house or other structure inhabited by disembodied spirits 
Haunted attraction (simulated), a type of amusement attraction

Disney
 The Haunted Mansion, a ride attraction located at many Disney theme parks.
 The Haunted Mansion (2003 film), a film starring Eddie Murphy based on the Disney attraction.
 Muppets Haunted Mansion, a 2021 puppet comedy, a Muppets property based on the Disney attraction
 Haunted Mansion (2023 film), an upcoming film starring Rosario Dawson based on the Disney attraction.
 Haunted Mansion Holiday, a seasonal overlay of the Disney attraction.
 Haunted Mansion (comic), a comic by Slave Labor Graphics based on the Disney attraction
 The Haunted Mansion (video game), based on the Disney attraction and 2003 film of the same name

Other uses
 Haunted Mansion (1998 film), a 1998 Hong Kong film
 Haunted Mansion (2015 film), a 2015 Philippine film

See also
 
 haunted house (disambiguation)